Harold Richard Atteridge (July 9, 1886 – January 15, 1938) was an American composer, librettist and lyricist primarily for musicals and revues.  He wrote the book and lyrics for over 20 musicals and revues for the Shubert family, including several iterations of The Passing Show.

Biography
Atteridge was born in Lake Forest, Illinois, the only child of Richard H. Atteridge and Ann T. O'Neill. He attended North Division High School, followed by college at the University of Chicago, where he was a member of the Phi Kappa Psi fraternity. In 1907 he wrote the Varsity show for the Black Friar's Club, and graduated with a Bachelor of Philosophy degree. His obituary quoted him on experience:  "If my success at this work illustrates anything it marks the importance of making an early start at one's profession. ...  All during college I was developing a revue and musical show technique in my work for a college organization called the Black Friars.  By the time I received my Bachelor of Philosophy degree I was a fairly proficient librettist."

His professional career began in Chicago as a lyricist for a music publishing firm. He first gained attention by writing the lyrics for two songs in the Chicago production of Madame Sherry. Producer George Lederer showed enthusiasm and advised Atteridge to move to New York.  He did so in September 1910.  He met with Jesse Louis Lasky who engaged him for a show at the New York Folies Bergère.  When that venue closed, and with a letter of introduction to J. J. Shubert, Atteridge auditioned some of his songs and was engaged to write for the Shuberts' productions.  Over the next two decades, he wrote dozens of shows, often writing both book and lyrics, for Broadway, including many starring Al Jolson, and several reviews in the successful series called The Passing Show.

Atteridge married his first wife, Laura, in 1912. He married his second wife, Mary Teresa Corless, on May 1, 1923.

By 1930 he was working in Hollywood, writing film continuities.  Later he wrote radio continuities for Al Jolson and Ed Wynn.

Atteridge died on January 15, 1938, of cirrhosis of the liver in Lynbrook, New York.  He was survived by his wife.

Working methods
In published interviews, Atteridge spoke of the process of writing a revue.

Recalling the composition of one of the songs for which he is best known, he said,  "Coming downtown on the subway the other evening I scribbled on the back of an envelope the lyrics of a one-step, 'By the Beautiful Sea,' and handed them that night to Harry Carroll. ...  Carroll immediately wrote a melody for the words and now the tune is proving a favorite at local dance palaces, cabarets, and restaurants.  Which goes to show that one can accomplish things of real value during otherwise idle moments."

List of works

Stage works for Broadway 

 The Orchid (1907) additional lyrics contributed for Broadway production
 Madame Sherry (1910) lyrics
 The Happiest Night of His Life (1911) lyrics
 Vera Violetta (1911) book and lyrics
 A Night with the Pierrots / Sesostra / The Whirl of Society (1912) lyrics
 Two Little Brides (1912) lyrics
 (From) Broadway to Paris (1912) book and lyrics
 The Man with Three Wives (1913) book and lyrics
 The Honeymoon Express (1913) lyrics
 The Passing Show of 1913 (1913) book and lyrics
 The Whirl of the World (1914) book and lyrics
 The Passing Show of 1914 (1914) book and lyrics
 Dancing Around (1914) book and lyrics
 Maid in America (1915) book and lyrics
 The Peasant Girl (1915) lyrics
 The Passing Show of 1915 (1915)  book and lyrics
 Hands Up (1915) additional lyrics
 The Blue Paradise (1915) additional lyrics
 A World of Pleasure (1915) book and lyrics
 Ruggles of Red Gap (1915) lyrics
 Robinson Crusoe, Jr. (1916) lyrics
 The Passing Show of 1916 (1916) book and lyrics
 The Show of Wonders (1916) book and lyrics
 The Passing Show of 1917 (1917)  book and lyrics
 Doing Our Bit (1917) book and lyrics
 Over the Top (1917) book
 Sinbad  (1918) book and lyrics
 Follow the Girl (1918) additional lyrics
 The Passing Show of 1918 (1918) book and lyrics
 Monte Cristo Jr. (1919) book and lyrics
 Shubert Gaieties of 1919 (1919) book
 The Passing Show of 1919 (1919) book and lyrics
 The Little Blue Devil (1919) book and lyrics
 Cinderella on Broadway (1920) book and lyrics
 The Passing Show of 1921 (1920) book and lyrics
 The Midnight Rounders of 1921 (1921) book
 The Last Waltz (1921) book and lyrics (English version)
 The Mimic World (1921) book and lyrics
 Bombo (1921) book and lyrics
 The Rose of Stamboul (1922) book and lyrics
 Make It Snappy (1922) book and lyrics
 The Passing Show of 1922 (1922) book and lyrics
 The Dancing Girl (1923) book and lyrics
 The Passing Show of 1923 (1923) book and lyrics
 Topics of 1923 (1923) book and lyrics
 Innocent Eyes (1924) book and lyrics
 Marjorie (1924) book and lyrics
 The Dream Girl (1924) book and additional lyrics
 The Passing Show of 1924 (1924) book and lyrics
 Big Boy (1925) book
 Sky High (1925) book and lyrics
 Artists and Models (1925) book
 Gay Paree (1925) book and additional lyrics
 A Night in Paris (1926) book
 The Great Temptations (1926) book
 A Night in Spain (1927) book
 Ziegfeld Follies of 1927 (1927) book
 The Greenwich Village Follies (1928) book, additional lyrics
 Pleasure Bound (1929) book and lyrics
 Thumbs Up! (1934) book

Film work
 The Ladies Man (1928) story
 Her Golden Calf (1930)  dialogue
 Big Boy (1930) play
 Poppin' the Cork'' (1933) dialogue

Notes

External links 

 
 

1886 births
1938 deaths
American musical theatre librettists
American musical theatre lyricists
People from Lake Forest, Illinois
University of Chicago alumni
People from Lynbrook, New York
Deaths from cirrhosis
20th-century American dramatists and playwrights
American male dramatists and playwrights
Songwriters from Illinois
20th-century American male writers